Abu Sel Bikhat-e Bozorg (also Romanized as Abū Sel Bīkhāt-e Bozorg; also known as Abū Salījān, Abū Salīkhān, Abusalixân, Abū Seley Bīkhāt, Abū Seleyb Khān, Boneh, Bonneh, and Kūpāl) is a village in Gheyzaniyeh Rural District, in the Central District of Ahvaz County, Khuzestan Province, Iran. At the 2006 census, its population was 140, in 31 families.

References 

Populated places in Ahvaz County